Mapat L. de Zatarain (born Martha Patricia López de Zatarain in Puebla, Mexico) is a Mexican producer.

Filmography

Awards and nominations

Premios TVyNovelas

References

External links

Mapat L. de Zatarain at the Filmweb
Mapat L. de Zatarain at the Esmas

Living people
Mexican telenovela producers
People from Puebla
Year of birth missing (living people)